Extension Gunners FC is a football club based in Lobatse, Botswana. The team plays in the Botswana Premier League. They play at the Lobatse Sports Complex.

History
The club was founded in 1962 in the town of Lobatse as the Lobatse CS Gunners. It is one of the biggest football clubs in Botswana.

Achievements
Botswana Premier League: 3
1992, 1993, 1994

Coca-Cola Cup Winners: 3
1988, 1992, 2011

Performance in CAF competitions
African Cup of Champions Clubs: 3 appearances
1993: Preliminary Round
1994: First Round
1995: Preliminary Round

CAF Confederation Cup: 1 appearance
2012:

References

Association football clubs established in 1962
Football clubs in Lobatse
1962 establishments in Bechuanaland Protectorate
Football clubs in Botswana